Bang Phli Yai is a tambon (subdistrict) of Bang Phli District, in Samut Prakan Province, Thailand. In 2017 it had a total population of 91,678 people.

Administration

Central administration
The tambon is subdivided into 23 administrative villages (muban).

Local administration
The area of the subdistrict is shared by 2 local governments.
the subdistrict municipality (Thesaban Tambon) Bang Phli (เทศบาลตำบลบางพลี)
the subdistrict administrative organization (SAO) Bang Phli Yai (องค์การบริหารส่วนตำบลบางพลีใหญ่)

References

External links
Thaitambon.com on Bang Phli Yai

Tambon of Samut Prakan Province